Gümüşsu is a town of Simav, Kütahya Province, Turkey. Gümüşsu is located 12 kilometres away from Simav.

Gümüşsu was formerly known as Kelemyenice.

External links 
 Gümüşsu website

Populated places in Kütahya Province
Towns in Turkey